Athletics at the 2010 Asian Games was held in Guangzhou, China from 21 to 27 November 2010. A total of 47 events were contested – 24 by men and 23 by women – matching the Olympic athletics programme. The 42 track and field events on the programme were hosted at the Aoti Main Stadium (Guangdong Olympic Stadium) while the marathons and racewalking competitions took place around the city's University Town (sharing a venue with the triathlon). Sixteen Asian Games records were broken during the seven-day competition.

China, the host country, topped the medal table having won 13 gold medals and 36 medals overall. India (12 medals overall) and Bahrain both won five golds, but Japan (with four golds) had the second largest overall medal haul with twenty. A number of countries had double-digit medal totals: Kazakhstan and South Korea won four gold medals each, with hauls of eleven and ten medals respectively. Qatar, Saudi Arabia and Uzbekistan were the next best performing National Olympic Committees. A total of 574 athletes (comprising 351 men and 223 women) from 41 nations took part in the competition. Bhutan, Brunei, Jordan and Pakistan were the only nations without a representative in the events.

One of the primary attractions of the competition was Chinese Olympic champion hurdler Liu Xiang – the stadium filled with around 70,000 spectators on the day he defended his title and he won gold in a Games record time. Chinese women completed 1–2 podium finishes in the shot put, discus and hammer throws while Zhou Chunxiu and Zhu Xiaolin took the top two spots in the women's marathon. Japan's Chisato Fukushima took a 100/200 metres sprint double and also won a bronze in the relay. Preeja Sreedharan of India broke two national records, almost completing a 5000 and 10,000 metres double, but was beaten by Mimi Belete in the former event. Femi Ogunode – a Nigerian-born athlete representing Qatar – won golds in both the 200 m and 400 m at the age of nineteen. Little-known Lao Yi won the men's 100 m after the favourites (Masashi Eriguchi and Samuel Francis) were both eliminated in the semi-finals.

Schedule

Medalists

Men

Women

Medal table

Participating nations
A total of 574 athletes from 41 nations competed in athletics at the 2010 Asian Games:

References

Day reports
Strong night for India as Asian Games kick off before a crowd of 75,000 in Guangzhou - Asian Games, Day 1. IAAF (2010-11-22). Retrieved on 2010-11-28.
Three more gold for China, as Kamel bows out of 1500m in Guangzhou - Asian Games, Day 2. IAAF (2010-11-23). Retrieved on 2010-11-28.
Jamal captures 1500m title in Guangzhou - Asian Games, Day 3. IAAF (2010-11-24). Retrieved on 2010-11-28.
70,000 watch Liu Xiang fly to 13.09sec victory - Asian Games, Day 4. IAAF (2010-11-25). Retrieved on 2010-11-28.
Ogunode and Fukushima complete doubles in Guangzhou - Asian Games, Day 5. IAAF (2010-11-26). Retrieved on 2010-11-28.
Bahrain takes two distance running golds - Asian Games, Day 6. IAAF (2010-11-27). Retrieved on 2010-11-28.
Ji and Zhou take Marathon titles as Asian Games conclude in Guangzhou. IAAF (2010-11-28). Retrieved on 2010-11-28.

External links
Athletics site of 2010 Asian Games

 
2010 Asian Games events
Asian Games
2010
2010 Asian Games